KGOU is a National Public Radio member news/talk/jazz music/blues music radio station serving the Oklahoma City area, western and northwestern Oklahoma, and towns in Pontotoc, Seminole and Grady counties.  It is licensed to the Board of Regents of the University of Oklahoma.  It is operated by OU's College of Continuing Education (OU Outreach), with studios in Copeland Hall on the OU campus. The staff consists of ten full-time and four part-time employees.

The station operates four full-power satellites: KROU (105.7 FM) in Spencer, KWOU (88.1 FM) in Woodward, KOUA (91.9 FM) in Ada, Oklahoma, and KQOU (89.1 FM) in Clinton, Oklahoma.  It also operates translators K276ET (103.1 FM) in Seminole, K250AU (97.9 FM) in Ada, K295BL (106.9 FM) in Chickasha and K286BZ (105.1 FM) in Shawnee.

The Clinton facility was added in December 2017, when Cameron University transferred its license for KCCU transmitter KYCU to KGOU. The move expands KGOU's listener base to 32 counties, nearly all in central, western and east-central Oklahoma. The new call sign for the Clinton transmitter is KQOU.

History
KGOU was originally licensed as a commercial rock music station to the University of Oklahoma in 1970, broadcasting at 106.3 FM. OU applied for a non-commercial Class A license and switched the station's format to NPR news and talk on New Year's Day, 1983. The studios were originally located in Kaufman Hall on the OU campus.

The station's repeater network began more or less out of necessity. KGOU's main signal operates at 6,000 watts, which is fairly modest for a full NPR member on the FM band. This was necessary to protect what is now KTUZ-FM at nearby 106.7. As a result, KGOU's signal is spotty at best in most of Oklahoma City. To solve this problem, soon after joining NPR, OU sought a license for a repeater station that would better cover the northern suburbs.  This station, KROU, officially signed on June 28, 1993. It was the first in a network of repeater stations that cover much of central and western Oklahoma.

KGOU's format is primarily news/talk on weekdays, with jazz, blues, and world music programs on weekends, broadcasting programs from NPR, PRI and other public radio networks alongside locally produced news and music programming.

KGOU renovated space in Copeland Hall on the OU campus in 2006 and moved its broadcasting studios that fall.

Repeaters

Translators

References

External links
KGOU station website

GOU
NPR member stations
Jazz radio stations in the United States
GOU
Radio stations established in 1970
1970 establishments in Oklahoma